Sanchai Ratiwatana and Christopher Rungkat were the defending champions but only Rungkat chose to defend his title, partnering Roberto Maytín. Rungkat lost in the final to Austin Krajicek and Jeevan Nedunchezhiyan.

Krajicek and Nedunchezhiyan won the title after defeating Maytín and Rungkat 6–7(4–7), 6–4, [10–5] in the final.

Seeds

Draw

References
 Main Draw

Nielsen Pro Tennis Championship - Doubles
2018 Doubles